Undichna simplicitas is a fish-fin, or fish-swimming fossil trackway left as a fossil impression on a substrate; this type of fossil is an ichnofossil, and in this case an ichnospecies. The ichnogenus for the fish-fin, or fish tracks is named Undichna.

Fossil trackways of Undichna simplicitas have been found in Alabama, USA, in the Pottsville Form, (Westphalian A, Upper Carboniferous, coal mine and tailings); also Indiana, Kansas, and Spain, (El Montsec and Las Hoyas).

See also
Fossil trackway
Trace fossil

References

External links
Birmingham Paleontological Society (PBS) report – Alabama, USA
Reference list-515, 657 – University of Alberta

Fish trace fossils
Fossil trackways